Somos Gitanos is the tenth studio album by the Gipsy Kings released in October 2001. It was released in 2001 in the US, Mexico, and Japan with different song orders. The Mexican and Japanese releases have the bonus song "One Love" written by Bob Marley. The Japanese release also has the bonus songs "Inspiration" and "Volare" that appeared on Gipsy Kings and Mosaïque respectively.

Track listing

Personnel
 Nicolas Reyes - lead vocals
 André Reyes - backing vocals, rhythm guitar
 Canut Reyes - backing vocals, rhythm guitar
 Patchai Reyes - backing vocals, rhythm guitar
 Tonino Baliardo - lead guitar
 Paco Baliardo - rhythm guitar
 Paul "Pablo" Reyes - rhythm guitar
Myriam SERFASS - harp improvisation on «Quiero Libertad »
 Gérard Prévost - arrangement, production
 Raphaël Jonin - mastering
 Claude Martinez - production

References

External links
Somos Gitanos at Discogs

2001 albums
Gipsy Kings albums
Nonesuch Records albums